The Kester Peaks are three aligned rock peaks standing together  south of Mount Malville on the east side of the Forrestal Range, in the Pensacola Mountains of Antarctica. They were mapped by the United States Geological Survey from surveys and U.S. Navy air photos from 1956 to 1966, and were named by the Advisory Committee on Antarctic Names for Larry T. Kester, a photographer with U.S. Navy Squadron VX-6 during Operation Deep Freeze in 1964.

References

Mountains of Queen Elizabeth Land
Pensacola Mountains